Ilfis Stadium is an indoor sporting arena built in 1975, located in Langnau i.E., Switzerland. The capacity of the arena is 6,000. It is the home arena of the SCL Tigers ice hockey team.

External links
SCL Tigers website (German)

Indoor ice hockey venues in Switzerland
Sports venues in the Canton of Bern
Sports venues completed in 1975
1975 establishments in Switzerland
20th-century architecture in Switzerland